McGarigle is a surname. Notable people with the surname include:

 Jennifer McGarigle (born 1970), American designer
 Tim McGarigle (born 1983), American football linebacker

See also
 McGarrigle